FC Krasnodar is a Russian professional football club based in Krasnodar. 

This list encompasses the major records set by the club and their players in the Russian Premier League. The player records section includes details of the club's goalscorers and those who have made more than 50 appearances in first-team competitions.

Player

Most appearances 

Players played over 50 competitive, professional matches only. Appearances include substitute appearances, (goals in parentheses).

Overall scorers 

Competitive, professional matches only, appearances including substitutes appear in brackets.

International representatives

Current Krasnodar players

Former Krasnodar players

References

2011–12 season 
2012–13 season
2013–14 season 
2014–15 season

External links 
  

FC Krasnodar
FC Krasnodar